Bajo las riendas del amor, (English: Under the reins of love) is a Mexican telenovela produced by Ignacio Sada for Televisa in association with Fonovideo Productions. It is a remake of the Mexican telenovela Cuando llega el amor produced in 1989. The series stars Adriana Fonseca as Montserrat and Gabriel Soto as Juan José.

Plot
Montserrat Linares and Juan Jose Alvarez will have to overcome adversities and obstacles that get in their way in order to live "Under the Reins of Love". Montserrat was part of the University horse-riding team. She is injured in an accident at a horse-riding competition and uses a wheelchair. Ingrid was disguised as a fairy without knowing her own revenge to destroy Montserrat forever until she is recognized with her disfigured face from the previous domestic accident. Montserrat recognizes Ingrid and she wanted to disfigure her face as her final revenge, but she escapes from her in the barn to go upstairs. Ingrid went hysterical and fell off and got stabbed from the racking fork. Her mother Rosa found out her own daughter dying saying "I am sorry" and she died. Juan and Monserrat are happily together.

Cast

Main 
Adriana Fonseca as Montserrat Linares
Gabriel Soto as Juan José Álvarez

Recurring 
Adamari López as Ingrid Linares
Víctor Cámara as Antonio Linares
Ariel López Padilla as Joaquín Corcuera
Julieta Rosen as Eloísa Corcuera
Víctor González as Víctor Corcuera
Elluz Peraza as Victoria Román
Alma Delfina as Rosa Nieto
Héctor Sáez as Don Lupe
Thauro - ‘’Profesor González’’
Abraham Ramos as Sebastián Corcuera
Rossana San Juan as Claudia García
Eduardo Rodríguez as Enrique Fernández
Pablo Azar as Daniel Linares
Géraldine Bazán as Verónica Orozco
Alberto Salaberry as Checo
Rolando Tarajano as Gonzalo
Norma Zúñiga as Amelia
Alejandro Speitzer as Antonio "Toñito" Linares
Evelyn Santos as Norma
Carla Rodríguez as Yolanda Álvarez
Paloma Márquez as Pili
Vannya Valencia asJimena
Melvin Cabrera as Paco
Jonathan Caballero as Benny
Elías Campos as El Pelos
Ximena Herrera as Maripaz García
Kathy Serrano as Wendy
Raúl Izaguirre as Professor Urrutia
Rosina Grosso as Carola

References

External links
 

Spanish-language American telenovelas
Spanish-language telenovelas
Mexican telenovelas
Televisa telenovelas
2007 telenovelas
2007 American television series debuts
2007 American television series endings
2007 Mexican television series debuts
2007 Mexican television series endings
Television shows set in Florida
Florida in fiction
Television shows filmed in Miami